The Honourable Frederick William Child-Villiers (20 July 1815 – 23 May 1871) was a British Conservative politician.

Child-Villiers was the son of George Child Villiers, 5th Earl of Jersey and Lady Sarah Sophia Fane. In 1842, he married Lady Elizabeth van Reede, daughter of Reynoud Diederik Jacob van Reede, 7th Earl of Athlone and Henrietta Dorothea Maria née Hope, but they had no children.

He served in the army, as a captain in the Coldstream Guards, and attained the rank of lieutenant-colonel in the 73rd (Perthshire) Regiment of Foot. 

Child-Villiers was elected Conservative Member of Parliament for Weymouth and Melcombe Regis at a by-election in 1847—caused by the resignation of William Dougal Christie—and held the seat until 1852 when he did not seek re-election.

In 1853 he was appointed Lt-Col Commandant of the new Royal Elthorne Light Infantry, a part-time Militia regiment in Middlesex.

He was High Sheriff of Northamptonshire in 1869.

References

External links
 

UK MPs 1847–1852
Conservative Party (UK) MPs for English constituencies
1815 births
1871 deaths
High Sheriffs of Northamptonshire
73rd Regiment of Foot officers
Middlesex Militia officers
Younger sons of earls